Santiago Agustín Rivas (born 18 September 2000) is an Argentine professional footballer who plays as a midfielder for Defensores Unidos.

Career
Rivas started his senior career with Primera B Metropolitana's Defensores Unidos. He was substituted on for his professional debut on 18 May 2019 versus Flandria after seventy-two minutes, though would depart the 3–1 loss four minutes later having received a red card; he had been substituted on in place of Fernando Magallán.

Career statistics
.

References

External links

2000 births
Living people
Place of birth missing (living people)
Argentine footballers
Association football midfielders
Primera B Metropolitana players
Defensores Unidos footballers